Coleophora castalia is a moth of the family Coleophoridae. It is found in north-western Afghanistan, northern Pakistan, Kashmir and north-eastern India (Assam, Khasi-Jaintia Hills).

The wingspan is about 18 mm. The head is ochreous-white and the palpi are whitish. The antennae are whitish ringed greyish-ochreous. The forewings are brownish, although the dorsal half is very pale ochreous. The hindwings are grey.

References

castalia
Moths described in 1930
Moths of Asia